Raymond Francis (6 October 1911- 24 October 1987) was a British actor best known for his role as Detective Chief Superintendent Tom Lockhart in the Associated-Rediffusion detective series Murder Bag, Crime Sheet and No Hiding Place. He played the role of Lockhart in these series from 1957 to 1967, and the character was one of the first recurring television detectives.

Career

Born in London as Reginald George Thompson, his first listed television role was as Dr. Watson alongside Alan Wheatley's Holmes in a 1951 BBC TV series entitled We Present Alan Wheatley as Mr Sherlock Holmes in..., the earliest TV adaptation of the tales. He later reprised the role in a 1984 film The Case of Marcel Duchamp.

His distinguished appearance often led to roles as senior policemen, military men and English aristocrats; he played such parts in series including Dickens of London, Edward & Mrs. Simpson, The Cedar Tree, Tales of the Unexpected, After Julius, Drummonds, the first Joan Hickson Miss Marple episode "The Body in the Library" as Sir Henry Clithering, and his final appearance was in a 1987 Ruth Rendell Mysteries adaptation.

He also appeared as Clement Lawrence in the 1973 episode 'The Windsor Royal' of the long running TV series Public Eye.

He was also a noted stage actor and made several appearances in films such as Carrington V.C. and Reach for the Sky.

Personal life
In 1935 he married as his first wife the actress Gabrielle Brune (1912-2005), who had appeared already in the 1930 film drama Red Pearls, as later in Ladislao Vajda’s British drama film The Wife of General Ling (1937, as Germaine), and had a long and prolific  career on the screen. His second wife was Margaret Towner (1920-2017), Brazil-born of an English family, also an actress. He met Margaret during World War II in connection with the  Entertainments National Service Association's (ENSA) touring stage production of The Amazing Dr. Clitterhouse. They  married and had three children, Caroline, Frances, and Clive, who also became an  actor. After her husband’s death in 1987, Margaret resumed her acting career and became well known to the public, appearing in Will Gould’s fantasy film  The Wolves of Kromer (1998, as Doreen), in George Lucas’s Star Wars: Episode I – The Phantom Menace (1999, as Jira), and in Ricky Gervais’s TV series  Derek  (2012, as Edna). Francis was outlived by both his wives, who died in their nineties.

Filmography
 Mr. Denning Drives North (1951) as Clerk of the Court
 Carrington V.C. (1955) as Major Mitchell
 Above Us the Waves (1955) as Officer on Towing Sub. (I)
 The Deep Blue Sea (1955) as RAF Officer Jackie Jackson (uncredited)
 Storm Over the Nile (1955) as Colonel's Aide
 Portrait of Alison (1955) as Police Inspector - Interpol Division (uncredited)
 Doublecross (1956) as Inspector Harris
 Bhowani Junction (1956) as Captain Cumberly (uncredited)
 Reach for the Sky (1956) as Wing Commander Hargreaves (uncredited)
 The Man in the Sky (1957) as Jenkins
 The Steel Bayonet (1957) as General
 Just My Luck (1957) as Ritchie
 Carve Her Name with Pride (1958) as S.O.E. Officer (uncredited)
 No Hiding Place (1959-1967, TV Series) as Chief Supt. Tom Lockhart
 Hell Is Empty (1967) as Defence Counsel
 It Shouldn't Happen to a Vet (1977) as Colonel Bosworth
 The Case of Marcel Duchamp (1984) as Dr. Watson

References

External links

1911 births
1987 deaths
English male film actors
English male television actors
Male actors from London
20th-century English male actors